The Oklahoma Library Association (OLA) is a non-profit organization that promotes libraries and library services and provides professional development for library personnel in the state of Oklahoma. OLA is a chapter of both the American Library Association and the Mountain Plains Library Association. OLA hosts workshops throughout the year and holds an Annual Conference. OLA is the official sponsor of the Sequoyah Book Award, the third oldest U.S. state children's choice award.

History
OLA was formed on May 16, 1907 by a small group of librarians from the University of Oklahoma and nearby normal schools as well as public libraries. The meeting was hosted by the now-defunct Carnegie Library in downtown Oklahoma City. These librarians were interested in forming a statewide library association to ensure the "statewide extension of tax-supported library service" and "to explore a more economical way of transporting...books."

OLA has sponsored the Read Y'all celebrity poster literacy campaign and the Mildred Laughlin Festival of Books. OLA used to publish a newsletter called Oklahoma Librarian, which ceased in 2018.

Notable Members
 Ruth Brown (librarian)
 Ruby Canton, daughter of lawman and former outlaw Frank M. Canton
 Milton J. Ferguson
 Allie Beth Martin
 Pat Woodrum

External links
 Oklahoma Library Association
 Read Y'all

References

Library-related professional associations
Library-related organizations
Library associations in the United States
Professional associations based in the United States
Organizations established in 1907
Organizations based in Oklahoma